Kalyoncu cabinet was the government of Northern Cyprus between 16 July 2015 and 16 April 2016, consisting of 10 ministers formed by a coalition of the Republican Turkish Party (CTP) and National Unity Party (UBP), under prime minister Ömer Kalyoncu from the CTP. The two parties shared the ministries equally, and formed a government for the first time. All ministers from the UBP were MPs, while the CTP initially had three from outside the parliament.

Composition 

On 19 October 2015, the cabinet was changed as three of the ministers from the CTP were replaced. Hasan Başoğlu, the Minister of Finance, was replaced by Birikim Özgür. According to Kalyoncu, this was due to Başoğlu's request for removal from his post because of his health problems. Önder Sennaroğlu, the Minister of Agriculture, Natural Resources and Food was replaced by Erkut Şahali and Aziz Gürpınar, the Minister of Interior and Labor by Asım Akansoy. Kalyoncu gave the reason for these replacements as "making the cabinet younger".

References 

Cabinets of Northern Cyprus